Štrigova is a village and municipality in Međimurje County, in northern Croatia.

History

Oldest archaeological finds in Štrigova municipality are from Roman period. Burial mounds and fragments of pottery were found in the hamlet of Trnovčak. Fragments of the Roman roads were found at the same locality.

The settlement Štrigova is first time mentioned in 1271 as Castr. Strigo (English: Fort Strigo). During that time fort was in possession of Arnold of Stridó. In year 1290 Andrew the Venetian, later king of Hungary and Croatia, was captured in fort Štrigova by Arnold of Stridó, and was sent to Vienna in captivity. In year 1334 Štrigova was recorded as Catholic parish named Sancte Marie Magdalene de Strigo in Census of parishes of Zagreb Diocese.  From the late Middle Ages until the beginning of the 20th century, Štrigova has the rights of a Market town.

During the 15th century feudal proprietor of Međimurje Frederick II, Count of Celje built the wooden chapel of saint Jerome in Štrigova. In year 1447 Papal bull Gloriosus Deus in sanctis suis (English: God is glorius in his Saints) was promulgated by Pope Nicholas V for Saint Jerome church in Štrigova. In that document Štrigova is mentioned as birthplace of Saint Jerome. But claims about birthplace of Saint Jerome are disputed by some scholars.

In year 1931 Štrigova municipality was separated from Čakovec District and the rest of Međimurje and placed under authority of Ljutomer District in Drava Banovina. In April 1941 Međimurje was occupied by Hungarian Army, but Štrigova were occupied by German Army. In June 1941, at the Hungarian request, Štrigova is again reincorporated in Međimurje.

In April 1945 former municipality Štrigova provisionally became a part of Yugoslav Federal republic of Slovenia. In 1946 Štrigova municipality was divided between People's Republics Croatia and Slovenia. Villages Banfi, Grabrovnik, Jalšovec, Leskovec, Prekopa, Robadje, Stanetinec, Sveti Urban and Štrigova became part of Croatia, and Gibina, Globoka, Kopriva, Razkrižje, Šafarsko, Šprinc, and Veščica became part of Slovenia. In year 1947 in forest near Štrigova Yugoslavian secret police (OZNA) murdered dozens of members of anticommunist guerrilla called Crusaders (Croatian: Križari).

In year 1992 Štrigova regained the status of municipality.

Geography

Štrigova is located in part of Međimurje called Gornje Međimurje at border with Slovenia. Village of Štrigova, municipality centre, is about 19 kilometres northwest from Čakovec, and some 110 kilometres north of Zagreb. The municipality covers an area of 39.21 km2.

Landscape of Štrigova consist of low hills called Međimurske gorice, covered with vineyards, orchards and woodlands. Međimurske gorice are extension of Slovenske gorice. At 341 metres, Mađerkin breg is the highest hill in municipality, and also a popular viewpoint. River Mura touches the border of municipality at its northernmost part.

Štrigova is located on road that connects county seat Čakovec with town of Ljutomer in Slovenia. There are two border crossing with Slovenia in municipality, called Banfi and Bukovje.

Demographics

In the 2011 census, the municipality had a population of 2,766 in 10 villages. Štrigova is experiencing population decline since the 1950s. The majority of inhabitants are Croats making up 94% of population and most significant minority are Slovenes (4%).

Settlements

Economy

The economy of the municipality is largely focused on its agriculture. Many hills in the municipality were planted with vineyards and the production of wine is a major business in the municipality. There are many wine cellars throughout the municipality, most of which are privately owned, but there is also a large communally-owned wine cellar in Štrigova.

Cattle breeding and dairy products are also an important part of the economy of the municipality, although to a lesser extent in comparison with the production of wine, as well as rural tourism.

Culture

The Church of St. Jerome was rebuilt in 1749 by famous artist Ivan Ranger following the demolition of the original 15th-century-built chapel by an earthquake in 1738. There are also two historical castles located in the municipality. The castle in Banfi (Bánfihegy) was built by Count Bánffy in 1373, and Tkalec Castle on Kalec hill is believed to be built by local Paulines in the 18th century.

Gallery

References

External links
Website of the municipality's tourist board

Populated places in Međimurje County
Municipalities of Croatia